Unisource Worldwide, Inc. is a subsidiary of Veritiv and is a distributor of printing paper, packaging equipment and supplies, and facility maintenance equipment and supplies. It also provides logistics services to other companies through its truck fleet and warehouses.

History and ownership
Unisource was formed in 1996 when it split off from Alco Standard Corporation. After acquiring several local and regional distributors, Unisource was itself acquired by Georgia-Pacific LLC in 1999.  In 2002, Bain Capital purchased a 60 percent ownership in Unisource Worldwide. Georgia-Pacific retains 40 percent ownership.

In 2004, the CEO, Chuck Tufano, was succeeded by Allan Dragone.

In 2005, the company donated $50,000 to the American Red Cross International Response Fund in response to the 2005 earthquake and tsunami in Southeast Asia.

In 2014, the company became a subsidiary of Veritiv, following the spin-off of International Paper's xpedx.

Sustainable business initiatives
Unisource was the first national paper distributor in the United States to attain certification from all three major chain-of-custody certification organizations: the Forest Stewardship Council™ (FSC®), the Sustainable Forestry Initiative® (SFI®), and the Programme for the Endorsement of Forest Certification (PEFC).

In 2010, Unisource began requesting supplies to fill out a Sustainability Scorecard "to ensure that environmental responsibility is being practiced and assessed according to standard industry procedures."

Unisource is a member of the Sustainable Packaging Coalition.

Unisource is a U.S. Green Building Council member.

References 

Companies based in Gwinnett County, Georgia
Companies established in 1996
Bain Capital companies
Corporate spin-offs
1999 mergers and acquisitions